Walter Bachmann (born 10 May 1949) is a Swiss sailor. He competed in the Finn event at the 1972 Summer Olympics.

References

External links
 

1949 births
Living people
Swiss male sailors (sport)
Olympic sailors of Switzerland
Sailors at the 1972 Summer Olympics – Finn
Place of birth missing (living people)